Bebra is a part of the town Sondershausen in Thuringia and it was first mentioned in a document in 1202. The village was incorporated in 1922.

The village is located west of Sondershausen at the foot of the mountain Frauenberg near the river Bebra. In the center stands the St. Georg Church. 

There are a natural pool and mills, too.

Sources 
 Ersterwähnung Thüringer Städte und Dörfer bis 1300; publisher: Harald Rockstuhl, 2001, 
 Liebeserklärung an eine Stadt – Sondershausen; publisher: Bildarchiv Röttig, 2000

Former municipalities in Thuringia
Kyffhäuserkreis